Health School was a football club from Bhutan, based at Changlimithang, who played in the inaugural Bhutan A-Division, then the top level of football in Bhutan, but since replaced by a full national league.

History
They finished seventh in the inaugural season, winning two and drawing two of their nine matches. They achieved victories over Motithang and Yangchengphug colleges 2–1 and 1–0 respectively, whilst drawing 0–0 with Public Works Department and 1–1 with Education. There are no records available for any competitions held between 1987–1995 so it is not known whether they competed again, and there is no record of them competing in any future season for which records exist.

References

Football clubs in Bhutan
Association football clubs established in 1986
1986 establishments in Bhutan
Sport in Thimphu